Night of the Demon (in the United States, released as Curse of the Demon) is a 1957 British horror film, produced by Hal E. Chester and Frank Bevis, directed by Jacques Tourneur and starring Dana Andrews, Peggy Cummins and Niall MacGinnis. It is adapted from the M. R. James story "Casting the Runes".

The film's storyline concerns an American psychologist who travels to England to investigate a satanic cult suspected in more than one death.

Turbulent artistic differences arose between producer Hal E. Chester on one side and director Tourneur and writer Charles Bennett on the other.  Chester's plan was to show the demon on screen, but Bennett, Tourneur, and lead actor Dana Andrews objected. To accelerate the pace and make the film more commercial, the 96-minute original feature was trimmed down to 82 minutes prior to its release in the United States. This shortened version was retitled Curse of the Demon, playing in June 1958 as the second half of a double feature with either The True Story of Lynn Stuart or The Revenge of Frankenstein (1958), depending on the local film market.

Plot
In England, Professor Harrington begs his rival, Dr. Julian Karswell, to rescind a curse he inflicted on him; in return, Harrington will cease his investigation into Karswell's Satanic cult. After learning that a parchment he gave Harrington has been destroyed, Karswell promises to do what he can. As Harrington arrives home, he sees a gigantic demon in the trees. Harrington tries to escape in his car but crashes into power lines. The authorities declare electrocution as the cause of death.

Dr. John Holden arrives in Britain to attend a convention at which Harrington had intended to expose Karswell's cult. He is informed that the only link between Harrington's death and Karswell's cult is a man suspected of murder, Rand Hobart, who has fallen into a catatonic stupor. While Harrington's collaborators consider the possibility of supernatural forces, Holden rejects such an option.

Holden meets Karswell at the Reading Room of the British Museum. When a rare book that Holden requests goes missing, Karswell offers to show Holden his own copy at his mansion. At Harrington's funeral, Holden meets Harrington's niece, Joanna. She gives him Harrington's diary, which details Harrington's fear of Karswell's power. Holden remains sceptical, but goes with Joanna to Karswell's mansion the next day. When a strong windstorm abruptly starts, Karswell claims to have created it with a spell. When Holden mocks him, Karswell claims that Holden will die in three days.

Holden and his colleagues discuss Karswell and make plans to examine Rand Hobart. Holden goes to dinner with Joanna and she shows him her uncle's diary. Harrington's diary mentions a parchment with runic writing on it that was passed to him by Karswell, and Holden finds a similar parchment that Karswell secretly passed to him at the library. A powerful wind comes through the window, blowing the parchment from his fingers towards the fireplace, only to be stopped by a fire screen. Holden recovers and pockets it.

Holden visits Hobart's family to seek permission to hypnotise Hobart and find out about the death he is suspected of. The mother gives her consent but says that the family are "believers." As Holden leaves, the parchment is blown from his hand. Hobart's family becomes fearful and declares Holden to be "chosen." Later, Holden compares the parchment's runes to ones inscribed on the nearby stone circle at Stonehenge.

Joanna takes Holden to a séance at the invitation of Karswell's mother. A medium claims to channel Harrington, who tells them that Karswell has the key to reading the runes in his copy of the rare book. After Holden abruptly exits, dismissing the séance as nonsense, Joanna says she intends to search for the key and they drive to Karswell's mansion. Holden breaks into the house while she waits outside. Inside, he is attacked by a cat that seems to morph into a panther. Holden is rescued by Karswell entering and switching on the light, saying he knew Holden would come. Against Karswell's warning, Holden leaves through the woods, and believes he is chased by a cloud of smoke and fire before escaping.

Under hypnosis, the suspect Hobart reveals to Holden that he was "chosen" to die by having a runic parchment passed to him, but avoided death by passing it back to the person who had given it to him. When Holden shows Hobart the parchment he had received from Karswell, Hobart thinks he is trying to give it to him. He becomes hysterical and jumps through a window to his death.

Holden learns Karswell is taking a train to Southampton, and on the train discovers that he has kidnapped and hypnotised Joanna. As the time for Holden's predicted death draws near, the train stops at the next station, and Karswell tries to leave. Holden manages to sneak the parchment into Karswell's coat pocket, and when Karswell finds it, it flies from his hand. He chases it down the tracks, but as he reaches it the parchment combusts. As an oncoming train approaches, the demon manifests and attacks Karswell. When his corpse is found by the tracks, the police believe that he was struck and dragged by the train. Holden, instead of going to inspect the body, departs with Joanna.

Cast
 Dana Andrews as Dr. John Holden
 Peggy Cummins as Joanna Harrington
 Niall MacGinnis as Dr. Julian Karswell
 Athene Seyler as Mrs. Karswell
 Liam Redmond as Professor Mark O'Brien
 Peter Elliott as Professor Kumar
 Maurice Denham as Professor Harrington
 Reginald Beckwith as Mr. Meek
 Rosamund Greenwood as Mrs Meek
 Brian Wilde as Rand Hobart
 Charles Lloyd Pack as Chemist (as Charles Lloyd-Pack)
 Ewan Roberts as Lloyd Williamson

Production
Screenwriter Charles Bennett owned the rights to the original story "Casting the Runes" and wrote a screenplay loosely based on it, using the title The Haunted. He sold his script to independent producer and former child actor Hal E. Chester shortly before going to America. Bennett later regretted selling the script, because on arrival in America he was approached by RKO, who wanted to purchase it and allow Bennett to direct the film. Actors Robert Taylor and Dick Powell had been in line for the leading roles if this production had taken place.

Despite having acquired the project from Bennett, Chester decided the Bennett screenplay was too tame, or as Tony Earnshaw described it, "too British". He hired blacklisted writer Cy Endfield to create the final screenplay. Despite his contribution, which Earnshaw said was "significant", Endfield was ultimately uncredited.

Jacques Tourneur was brought in by Chester on the recommendation of Ted Richmond, the producer of Tourneur's previous film, Nightfall (1957). However, Tourneur and Chester had serious disagreements during filming. One argument was about the wind scene; Tourneur tried to convince Chester to replace two electric fans with two aeroplane engines. When Chester hesitated, star Dana Andrews threatened to leave the picture if Chester did not let "the director direct the picture". Locations for the film include Brocket Hall, Hertfordshire (as Lufford Hall), Stonehenge, Bricket Wood railway station and the Reading Room of the British Museum.

Producer Chester and his British co-producer, Frank Bevis, had decided to show the demon at the beginning and end of the film. Tourneur later said that he was against the addition: "The scenes where you see the demon were shot without me...the audience should never have been completely certain of having seen the demon". Stop motion master Ray Harryhausen was requested by Columbia Pictures to create the demon for the production, but he was already committed to his Dynamation film The 7th Voyage of Sinbad with producer Charles H. Schneer. Author Tony Earnshaw's book Beating the Devil: The Making of Night of the Demon argues that showing the demon was planned early on in the production (despite Tourneur's protests to the contrary), in order to heighten the tension in the film by letting the audience know the demonic powers were real. Bennett, also angry at the script changes, said "If [Chester] walked up my driveway right now, I'd shoot him dead".

Release

Theatrical
Night of the Demon was released in November 1957 in the United Kingdom. It was shown on a double feature with the American film 20 Million Miles to Earth. In the United States, it was released as Curse of the Demon. According to Charles Bennett, the title was changed because the studio did not want it confused with the similarly titled The Night of the Iguana. It had the same reduced length of 82 minutes for its June 1958 American release. The scenes removed included a visit to the Hobart family farm, a trip to Stonehenge, and snippets of the séance scenes and conversations between Karswell and his mother. The visit to the British Library scene was rearranged in the film's viewing continuity. In the United States Curse of the Demon toured drive-ins and theatres as a double feature with either The True Story of Lynn Stuart or The Revenge of Frankenstein.

Home media
In the United States, the film was released on VHS in 1986 by Columbia TriStar Home Video with a run time of 83 minutes. A second VHS with the Continental 96-minute running time was released by Goodtimes Home Video Corp in 1988. In the same year, the film was released on LaserDisc by Image Entertainment/Columbia Pictures with an 81-minute running time. Including both the Continental version (Night of the Demon) and the 83-minute US version (Curse of the Demon), the film was released on DVD in August 2002.

In the United Kingdom, Night of the Demon was released on VHS in 1995 by Encore Entertainment/Columbia TriStar Home Video. The film was released on DVD in the United Kingdom for the first time on 18 October 2010. This release also includes both the Continental and US versions of the film. A Blu-ray edition from Powerhouse Films' Indicator label, featuring four different cuts of the film, was released as a UK all-region release on 22 October 2018.

Reception
In a contemporary review, the Monthly Film Bulletin commented that Tourneur's direction was "handled with much of the assurance the same director brought to Cat People" and that the film was "way above average". The review commented on the image of the demon, stating whenever the demon takes on a visible form, "especially the ending", it seemed more like a product of "a child's nightmare than an adult's imagination".

In the early 2010s, Time Out conducted a poll with several authors, directors, actors and critics who have worked within the horror genre to vote for their top horror films. Night of the Demon placed at number 52 on their top 100 list. Director Martin Scorsese placed Night of the Demon on his list of the 11 scariest horror films of all time.

See also
 List of British films of 1957

References
Notes

Bibliography
Bansak, Edward G. Fearing the Dark: The Val Lewton Career. McFarland, 1995. .
Earnshaw, Tony. Beating the Devil: The Making of Night of the Demon. Tomahawk Press, 2004. 
Fujiwara, Chris. Jacques Tourneur: The Cinema of Nightfall. McFarland, 1998. .
 
Peary, Danny. Cult Movies 2: Fifty More of the Classics, the Sleepers, the Weird, and the Wonderful. Dell, 1989. .

External links
 
 
 
 
 
 

1957 films
1957 horror films
1950s monster movies
Adaptations of works by M. R. James
British black-and-white films
British horror films
British supernatural horror films
Columbia Pictures films
Demons in film
1950s English-language films
Films based on short fiction
Films directed by Jacques Tourneur
Films about hypnosis
Films about curses
Films scored by Clifton Parker
Films set in London
Films shot at Associated British Studios
Films shot in Hertfordshire
Films shot in London
1950s British films